Johnny Evans was a university all-star and Grey Cup champion Canadian football quarterback.

While attending Queen's University, Evans had a spectacular football career. Quarterback for a Grey Cup championship dynasty, he led the Golden Gaels to two of their three victories (1922 & 1923), scoring two touchdowns in the 11th Grey Cup (the greatest victory in the history of the game; 54-0 over the Regina Roughriders). He was one of the top quarterbacks in the country, being selected as a Toronto Globe all-star three times.

He also played one season for the Hamilton Tigers in 1924.

Evans was one of the best players to ever wear the Tricolour, and one of Queen's best quarterbacks. After his tragic accidental death in 1930, the University Football Team has presented an award, the Johnny Evans Memorial Award for Most Valuable Player, to honour his memory. He has been enshrined in the Queen's University Football Hall of Fame.

References

Queen's University at Kingston alumni
1930 deaths
Sportspeople from Kingston, Ontario
Players of Canadian football from Ontario
Queen's Golden Gaels football players
Hamilton Tigers football players
Year of birth missing